Leslie M. Little is a judge currently serving on the Tax Court of Canada.

References

Living people
Judges of the Federal Court of Canada
Schulich School of Law alumni
Year of birth missing (living people)